Harry S. Robins or Harry Scifres Robins (born November 28, 1950), known as "Hal", is an American voice actor, screenwriter, and cartoonist. Robins is best known for his vocal work in the Half-Life series of computer games and as the voice of Tinker in Dota 2. He is also a prominent member of the Church of the SubGenius, and has written and drawn comic book art/stories for them. In the persona of Dr. Howland Owll, he has voiced the narrator in Arise! The SubGenius Video and made brief appearances in Grass. His official title within the church is "Master of Church Secrets".

Radio
He can be heard on KPFA on a show called 'Puzzling Evidence' that started back in 1982. His description of the radio show:
"Deranged “edits” segue into a cascade of echoing glossolaliac madness, the voicing of lyric ruminations from the free-falling brains of disintegrating personalities. And some people, demented individuals, obsessively record every word and squealing sound effect. Of course, you may just hate it."

Film and television
Robins co-wrote the film Kamillions with director Mike B. Anderson, in addition to playing Nathan, the Wingate family patriarch and benevolent mad scientist.

He appeared on a television show, The Conspiracy Zone, for two seasons in 2002, on now-defunct TNN, in which he was the announcer and made several on-camera appearances. He also appeared as one of several underground comic experts in the documentary film, God's Cartoonist: The Comic Crusade of Jack Chick.

Literature and comic books
Robins has been a comic book artist and cartoonist, appearing in R. Crumb's Weirdo magazine and various comic books, including Legal Action Comics II and Alien Apocalypse 2006.  Many of his horror comics were anthologized in Grave Yarns.  He also wrote and illustrated The Meaning of Lost and Mismatched Socks published by Frog, Ltd. (a division of North Atlantic Books), which also published his book Dinosaur Alphabet. His work also appears in popular trading card sets, including Dinosaurs Attack by Topps, and Tune In For Terror from Monsterwax Trading Cards.

The Church of the SubGenius
As Dr. Howland Owll, Robins contributed to The Book of the SubGenius and Revelation X: the "Bob" Apocryphon.  His short story "The Smoker from the Shadows" appears in the anthology Three-Fisted Tales of "Bob".  He also contributed to the SubGenius comic book, "Bob's" Favorite Comics (a rarity, of which most copies were burned in a warehouse fire). In addition, Robins' work appears in the 2006 SubGenius book, Psychlopaedia of Slack: The Bobliographon.

References

External links

 Ask Dr. Hal
 Elect Harry S. Robins for Congress 2010
 Laughingsquid.com

Place of birth missing (living people)
Living people
American SubGenii
American male voice actors
American male screenwriters
American male film actors
American comics artists
American cartoonists
American male video game actors
1950 births